The white-spotted supple skink (Riopa albopunctata) is a species of diurnal, terrestrial, insectivorous skink found in parts of tropical Asia. This species was first described by John Edward Gray based on type specimen collected by T. C. Jerdon from Madras, in the Coromandel Coast of South India.

Description

The white-spotted supple skink is found in South Asia. Its body is elongated with weak limbs. The distance between the end of its snout and forelimbs is 2 to 2.5 times the distance between the axilla and groin. The snout is short and obtuse. The lower eyelid is scaly. Supranasals are present and in contact behind the rostral. The frontonasal is much broader than long and in contact with the frontal. The prefrontal is small. The frontal is as long as the fronto parietals and interparietal together, and is in contact with the first and second supraoculars. There are four supraoculars. There are seven or eight supraciliaris, with the first and last being the largest. The fronto parietals are distinct and larger than the interparietal. The panetals form a suture behind the interparietal; The nuchols are frequently indistinct. The fifth upper labial is below the centre of the eye. The ear-opening is small and oval, with one or two small lobules anteriorly. There are 26 or 28 scales around the middle of the body, all of which are smooth and subequal. The marginal preanals are scarcely enlarged. The fore limb stretched forwards reaches the ear or a little beyond. The length of the hind limb is contained 2.3 to 3 times in the distance between the axilla and groin. The fourth toe is longer than the third. The subdigital lamellae are feebly unicarinate, with 12 to 15 under the fourth toe. The tail is thick and a little longer than the head and body. It is pale brown or rufous above, and the sides are closely dotted with black. Each dorsal and nuchal scale has a more-or-less distinct dark brown dot, forming a longitudinal series. The sides of the neck and anterior part of the body are white-spotted. The lower surface is yellowish white.

Distribution
It is found in mainland India except perhaps the Thar desert and Himalayas; distribution continues and on to Bhutan, Bangladesh, Nepal, Indochina, Vietnam, Malaysia and even the islands of Maldives.

Notes

References
 Bobrov, V. V. 1995 Checklist and bibliography of lizards of Vietnam. Smithsonian Herpetological Information Service  (105): 
 Gray, J. E. 1846 Descriptions of some new species of Indian Lizards. Ann. Mag. Nat. Hist. (1)18: 429-430
 Smith,M.A. 1935 Reptiles and Amphibia, Vol. II. in: The fauna of British India, including Ceylon and Burma. Taylor and Francis, London, 440 pp.

External links
 

Riopa
Reptiles of South Asia
Reptiles of Southeast Asia
Reptiles of Thailand
Reptiles described in 1846
Taxa named by John Edward Gray